Italy competed at the 1993 Mediterranean Games in Languedoc-Roussillon, France.

Medals

Athletics

Men

Women

See also
 Judo at the 1993 Mediterranean Games
 Volleyball at the 1993 Mediterranean Games
 Water polo at the 1993 Mediterranean Games

References

External links
 Mediterranean Games Athletics results at Gbrathletics.com
 1993 - AGDE LANGUEDOC-ROUSSILLON (FRA) at CIJM web site

Nations at the 1993 Mediterranean Games
1993
Mediterranean Games